Theodore Russell (October 15, 1948 - January 17, 2012) was an American professional wrestler, best known under the ring name of "Savannah Jack" in Bill Watts' Universal Wrestling Federation in the Mid-South from 1986 to 1987. He won the UWF Television Championship.

Early life
Russell started playing football for the University of Minnesota for the Minnesota Golden Gophers from 1969 to 1970.

Pro wrestling career
Trained by Verne Gagne and Eddie Sharkey in Minnesota. He worked for the American Wrestling Association as T-Bone Brown in 1985.

In 1986 he made his debut as "Savannah Jack" in Universal Wrestling Federation working for Bill Watts. At first he was a member of Skandor Akbar's stable Devastation, Inc.. He defeated Buddy Roberts of The Fabulous Freebirds for the UWF Television Championship on November 9, 1986 in Tulsa, Oklahoma. He would feud with Chris Adams, One Man Gang, Iceman Parsons and Sting. He lost the title to Eddie Gilbert on March 8, 1987. Later that year he retired from wrestling due to health problems that caught up with him in Fort Worth, Texas, where he coughed up a blood clot shortly before a match. He returned to Minnesota and was diagnosed with cardiomyopathy caused by years of steroid abuse.

Death
After many years of health problems he suffered a stroke in 2001. On January 17, 2012 Jack died from cardiomyopathy after 25 years of heart problems in his home in Minneapolis. He was 63.

Championships and accomplishments
Pro Wrestling America
PWA Tag Team Championship (1 time) - with Ed Roberts
Universal Wrestling Federation (Bill Watts)
 UWF Television Championship (1 time)

References
General

Specific

External links

Savannah Jack at Cagematch.net
Savannah Jack at OWW.com
Savannah Jack at WrestlingData.com

1948 births
2012 deaths
Sportspeople from Saint Paul, Minnesota
Professional wrestlers from Minnesota
American male professional wrestlers
African-American male professional wrestlers
Minnesota Golden Gophers football players
Players of American football from Minnesota
20th-century African-American sportspeople
21st-century African-American people
Professional wrestlers from Minneapolis